Adolf Hurwitz (26 March 1859 – 18 November 1919) was a German mathematician who worked on algebra, analysis, geometry and number theory.

Early life
He was born in Hildesheim, then part of the Kingdom of Hanover, to a Jewish family and died in Zürich, in Switzerland. His father Salomon Hurwitz, a merchant, was not wealthy. Hurwitz's mother, Elise Wertheimer, died when he was three years old. Family records indicate that he had siblings and cousins, but their names have yet to be confirmed except for an older brother, Julius, with whom he developed an arithmetical theory for complex continued fractions circa 1890. He was taught mathematics there by Hermann Schubert. Schubert persuaded Hurwitz's father to allow him to attend university, and arranged for Hurwitz to study with Felix Klein at Munich. Salomon Hurwitz could not afford to send his son to university, but his friend, Mr. Edwards, assisted financially.

Educational career
Hurwitz entered the University of Munich in 1877, aged 18. He spent one year there attending lectures by Klein, before spending the academic year 1877–1878 at the University of Berlin where he attended classes by Kummer, Weierstrass and Kronecker, after which he returned to Munich.

In October 1880, Felix Klein moved to the University of Leipzig. Hurwitz followed him there, and became a doctoral student under Klein's direction, finishing a dissertation on elliptic modular functions in 1881.  Following two years at the University of Göttingen, in 1884 he was invited to become an Extraordinary Professor at the Albertus Universität in Königsberg; there he encountered the young David Hilbert and Hermann Minkowski, on whom he had a major influence. Following the departure of Frobenius, Hurwitz took a chair at the Eidgenössische Polytechnikum Zürich (today the ETH Zürich) in 1892 (having to turn down a position at Göttingen shortly after ), and remained there for the rest of his life.

Throughout his time in Zürich, Hurwitz suffered from continual ill health, which had been originally caused when he contracted typhoid whilst a student in Munich. He suffered from severe migraines, and then in 1905, his kidneys became diseased and he had one removed.

Contributions to mathematics

He was one of the early students of the Riemann surface theory, and used it to prove many of the foundational results on algebraic curves; for instance Hurwitz's automorphisms theorem. This work anticipates a number of later theories, such as the general theory of algebraic correspondences, Hecke operators, and Lefschetz fixed-point theorem. He also had deep interests in number theory. He studied the maximal order theory (as it now would be) for the quaternions, defining the Hurwitz quaternions that are now named for him. In the field of control systems and dynamical systems theory he derived the Routh–Hurwitz stability criterion for determining whether a linear system is stable in 1895, independently of Edward John Routh who had derived it earlier by a different method.
In Lie theory, Hurwitz proved the existence of the Haar measure on Lie groups (which Haar then extended to locally compact groups).

Family
In 1884, whilst at Königsberg, Hurwitz met and married Ida Samuel, the daughter of a professor in the faculty of medicine. They had three children.

Selected publications
  Hurwitz, A., 1898. Ueber die Composition der quadratischen Formen von beliebig vielen Variablen. Nachrichten von der Gesellschaft der Wissenschaften zu Göttingen, Mathematisch-Physikalische Klasse, 1898, pp. 309–316.
 Vorlesungen über allgemeine Funktionentheorie und elliptische Funktionen (= Die Grundlehren der mathematischen Wissenschaften in Einzeldarstellungen mit besonderer Berücksichtigung der Anwendungsgebiete. vol. 3). Edited and supplemented by a section on geometric Funktionentheorie by Richard Courant. Springer, Berlin 1922 (4th, extended and edition with an appendix by Helmut Röhrl, ibid 1964, online text)
 Mathematische Werke. Publlished by the Department of Mathematics and Physics of the Eidgenössischen Technischen Hochschule in Zürich. 2 vols. Birkhäuser, Basel 1932–1933 (with a memoir on Hurwitz by Ernst Meissner)
 Übungen zur Zahlentheorie. 1891–1918 (= Schriftenreihe der ETH-Bibliothek. vol. 32). Translated by Barbara Aquilino. As a duplicated manuscript edited by Herbert Funk and Beat Glaus. ETH-Bibliothek, Zürich 1993, . 
 Lectures on Number Theory. Edited for publication by Nikolaos Kritikos. Translated with some additional material (from the German) by William C. Schulz. Springer, New York 1986, . 
 Karl Weierstraß: Einleitung in die Theorie der analytischen Funktionen. Vorlesung Berlin 1878 (= Dokumente zur Geschichte der Mathematik. vol. 4). In a transcript by Adolf Hurwitz. Edited by Peter Ullrich. Vieweg, Braunschweig 1988, .

See also

 First Hurwitz triplet
 Hurwitz class number
 Hurwitz determinant
 Hurwitz matrix
 Hurwitz numbers
 Hurwitz polynomial
 Hurwitz problem
 Hurwitz quaternion order
 Hurwitz quaternion
 Hurwitz scheme
 Hurwitz surface
 Hurwitz zeta function
 Hurwitz's automorphisms theorem
 Hurwitz's theorem (complex analysis)
 Hurwitz's theorem (composition algebras)
 Hurwitz's theorem (normed division algebras)
 Hurwitz's theorem (number theory)
 Radon–Hurwitz numbers
 Riemann–Hurwitz formula

Notes

External links

 
 LMS obituary
 
 Recording of the 2008 "Hurwitz Memorial Lecture" (Prof. Christos H. Papadimitriou) 

19th-century German Jews
1859 births
1919 deaths
People from Hildesheim
Academic staff of the University of Königsberg
Academic staff of ETH Zurich
19th-century German mathematicians
20th-century German mathematicians
Leipzig University alumni
People from the Kingdom of Hanover